A syndicate is a self-organizing group formed to transact some business or promote a common interest.

Syndicate may also refer to:
Syndicate (The X-Files), an organization in the television series The X-Files
Syndicate (series), a series of computer games
Syndicate (1993 video game), the first game in the above series
Syndicate: American Revolt, a 1993 expansion set for Syndicate
Syndicate Wars, the second game in the above series
Syndicate (2012 video game), a series reboot
Assassin's Creed Syndicate, the ninth main installment in the Ubisoft series of video games
Syndicate, Indiana, a town in the United States
Syndicate, Queensland, a locality in the Shire of Douglas, Queensland, Australia
"Syndicate" (song), a 2008 song by The Fray
 Syndicate (Internet personality), the moniker of internet personality, Tom Cassell
 Syndicate (TV series), a 2022 Bangladeshi TV series.
 Syndicate (group), an Australian rock group

See also
Syndic, an officer of government
Syndication (disambiguation)
The Syndicate (disambiguation)